Flinton Creek is a creek in the Moira River and Lake Ontario drainage basins in Hastings and Lennox and Addington Counties in Ontario, Canada.

Course
It travels west, passes under Ontario Highway 41, heads southwest to the east of the community of Flinton, and reaches its mouth at the Skootamatta River just over the border into Hastings County. The Skootamatta River flows via the Moira River into the Bay of Quinte on Lake Ontario at Belleville.

References

Rivers of Hastings County
Rivers of Lennox and Addington County